Scaposodus is a genus of longhorn beetles of the subfamily Lamiinae, containing the following species:

 Scaposodus indicus Breuning, 1969
 Scaposodus rufulus Breuning, 1961

References

Pteropliini